Events from the year 1763 in Russia

Incumbents
 Monarch – Catherine II

Events

 
 Palace Embankment
 Mozdok
Moscow Orphanage

Births

Deaths

 
 May 11 – Natalia Lopukhina, Russian noble, court official and alleged political conspirator. (born 1699)

References

1763 in Russia
Years of the 18th century in the Russian Empire